The 1985 World Table Tennis Championships – Corbillon Cup (women's team) was the 31st edition of the women's team championship.

China won the gold medal defeating North Korea 3–0 in the final, South Korea won the bronze medal.

Medalists

Final tables

Group A

Group B

Semifinals

Third-place playoff

Final

See also
List of World Table Tennis Championships medalists

References

-
1985 in women's table tennis